Michael Jacobs (born June 28, 1955) is an American television creator, writer and producer whose work has appeared on Broadway, Off Broadway, television and film. He is the creator/producer or has written and developed several television series including Boy Meets World, Dinosaurs, Charles in Charge, My Two Dads, The Torkelsons, and Girl Meets World. His television shows have won the Emmy, People's Choice, Parent's Choice, Environmental Media Awards, and more.

Early life
Jacobs was born June 28, 1955, in Highland Park, New Jersey. He attended Highland Park High School (New Jersey). Jacobs grew up in New York City, New York; Fort Lauderdale, Florida; and Los Angeles, California.

Career
Jacobs began his career as a writer and an actor. As an actor, he toured with the New Jersey Shakespeare Festival, appeared in a Los Angeles production of Godspell, and made an appearance on the soap-opera Days of Our Lives.

His play, Cheaters, had its premiere in South Florida in 1977, winning the Carbonell Award for "Best New Play." It opened in 1978 at the Biltmore Theatre in New York, starring Doris Roberts, Jack Weston, Lou Jacobi and Rosemary Murphy, when he was twenty-two years old, making him one of the youngest playwrights in Broadway history. His next play, Getting Along Famously was produced off-Broadway in 1984, at the Hudson Guild Theatre. His play, Impressionism opened on Broadway in 2009 at the Gerald Schoenfeld Theatre, starring Jeremy Irons and Joan Allen.

He was nominated for the Academy Award, Golden Globe, National Board of Review and BAFTA Award for Best Film for producing the 1994 motion picture, Quiz Show, which also won the New York Film Critics Circle Award. He won the People's Choice Award (Best New Comedy) for My Two Dads and was nominated for the Emmy Award (Outstanding Children's Program) for Girl Meets World in 2015 and again in 2016, and once again in 2017, which was also nominated for the Humanitas Prize, the WGA Award, the PGA Award, as well as the Kids' Choice Award and Teen Choice Award.

In 2007, he produced the documentary, As Seen Through These Eyes, about artists who were captured during the Holocaust and at risk of their lives created visual records so the world would know what happened. The film is narrated by Maya Angelou, (I Know Why The Caged Bird Sings) and has been named "Best Film" or "Best Documentary" at multiple film festivals nationally and internationally.

He wrote and directed Maybe I Do, starring Diane Keaton, Richard Gere, Susan Sarandon, William H. Macy, Emma Roberts, and Luke Bracey. It opened in theaters on January 27th 2023 and will begin streaming on Amazon Prime, Apple TV+, YouTube and other premium channels on Valentine's Day.

Television
His production company, Michael Jacobs Productions, has been in long-term development partnerships with NBCUniversal Television Distribution, Columbia TriStar Television, Buena Vista Television. His television shows have appeared on ABC, NBC, CBS, FOX, Disney Channel and The WB television networks.

Boy Meets World
In 2018, Boy Meets World celebrated its 25th anniversary on television, having been broadcast continuously since 1993 on ABC, Disney Channel, and currently on TeenNick and MTV2. Michael and the cast were reunited in June 2013, as the featured panel at the second annual ATX Television Festival in Austin, Texas. He was quoted there as saying, "I don't see anything on television right now that is speaking to the audience I have always spoken to and care very much about." Girl Meets World premiered on June 27, 2014, running for three seasons to substantial success before Disney Channel ended the show,  allegedly out of concerns the show's characters were aging out of the channel's target audience.

In 2018, all episodes of Boy Meets World along with Dinosaurs began their run on the streaming service, Hulu. Both Boy Meets World and Girl Meets World have since moved to Disney Plus.

Michael is also the writer or co-writer of the theme songs for Charles in Charge, My Two Dads, The Torkelsons and Lost at Home. He co-wrote Always You, the theme for Maybe I Do with Ruth B. It was released as a single along with the opening of the movie on January 27th.

Film
Maybe I Do  (2023)
As Seen Through These Eyes (Documentary) (2007)
Quiz Show (1994)

Television
Girl Meets World (Disney Channel; 2014–2017)
Lost at Home (ABC; 2003)
Zoe, Duncan, Jack and Jane (WB; 1999–2000)
You Wish (ABC; 1997–1998)
Maybe This Time (ABC; 1995–1996)
Misery Loves Company (FOX; 1995–1996)
Boy Meets World (ABC; 1993–2000)
Where I Live (ABC; 1993–1994)
Dinosaurs (ABC; 1991–1994)
The Torkelsons/Almost Home (NBC; 1991–1993)
Singer & Sons (NBC; 1990)
My Two Dads (NBC; 1987–1990)
Together We Stand (CBS; 1986-1987)
Charles in Charge (CBS; 1984–1985; Syndicated; 1987–1990)
No Soap, Radio (ABC; 1982)

Theatre
Cheaters (Biltmore Theatre) 1978
Getting Along Famously (Hudson Guild Theatre) 1984
Impressionism (Gerald Schoenfeld Theatre) 2009

Awards and nominations

References

External links 
 
 

1955 births
Film producers from New Jersey
Living people
People from Highland Park, New Jersey
People from Middlesex County, New Jersey
Showrunners
Television producers from New Jersey